The Big Punch is an American drama boxing film released in 1948. The film was directed by Sherry Shourds, produced by Saul Elkins and stars Gordon MacRae, Lois Maxwell, Wayne Morris, Mary Stuart and Eddie Dunn. It is considered to be a film noir and was MacRae's film debut after having signed a five-year contract with Warner Bros.

Plot
New York City boxer Johnny Grant has been ordered by his manager to throw his next match, but Johnny double-crosses him and knocks out his opponent instead. To even the score, the manager kills a police officer and frames Johnny for the murder.

Johnny leaves town and hides out with pastor Chris Thorgenson in a small Pennsylvania town. Johnny phones his girlfriend Midge Parker and asks that she hire a private detective to clear his name. Chris helps him secure a bank job, but Johnny is blackmailed into robbing the bank. Johnny refuses and plots to run away, but Chris stops him.

A police chief identifies Johnny as the wanted killer. Karen Long convinces the chief to let them find the real murderer, and she and Chris travel to New York to help with the search. The real killer is revealed, and now that his name has been cleared, Johnny returns to New York.

Cast
The picture marked MacRae's film-acting debut after having signed a five-year contract with Warner Bros. Maxwell would later be cast in the role of Miss Moneypenny in the James Bond franchise from 1962 - 1985, and Stuart went on to appear in the soap operas Search for Tomorrow (35 years), One Life to Live and Guiding Light. 
 Wayne Morris as Chris Thorgenson
 Lois Maxwell as Karen Long
 Gordon MacRae as Johnny Grant
 Mary Stuart as Midge Parker
 Anthony Warde as Con Festig
 Jimmy Ames as Angel Panzer
 Marc Logan as Milo Brown
 Eddie Dunn as Ed Hardy
 Charles Marsh as Sam Bancroft
 Dick Walsh as Quarterback
 Douglas Kennedy as Announcer
 Joe McTurk as Blinkie

Reception
Variety said of MacRae's film debut: "He should get along in films, presenting an easy personality and an ability to read lines credibly. He doesn't need vocalizing to sell himself."

Leonard Maltin said that the film was a "serviceable melodrama." The Internet Movie Database rates it as 6.6/10 based on user reviews. The Screen Guild Theater broadcast a 30-minute radio adaptation of the story on February 3, 1949 (episode 412), with Wayne Morris reprising his film role.

According to Warner Bros. records, the film earned $493,000 domestically and $177,000 foreign.

See also
 List of film noir titles

References

External links
 
 
 
 

1948 films
Warner Bros. films
1940s sports drama films
Films scored by William Lava
American sports drama films
American black-and-white films
1948 drama films
1940s American films